Otoconcha is a genus of small air-breathing semi-slugs, terrestrial pulmonate gastropod molluscs in the family Charopidae.

Otoconcha is the type genus of the subfamily Otoconchinae.

Description 
Frederick Wollaston Hutton firstly defined this genus in 1884. Hutton's diagnosis reads as follows:

Species
Species within the genus Otoconcha include:
 Otoconcha dimidiata (Pfeiffer, 1853) - type species
 Otoconcha fiordlandica (Dell, 1952)
 Otoconcha oconnori (Powell, 1941)
 Otoconcha roscoei Climo, 1971

References
This article incorporates public domain text from the reference

External links 
 Baker H. B. (1938) "The Endodont genus Otochoncha". Journal of Molluscan Studies 23: page 89-91.
 Dell R. K. (1952). "Otoconcha and its allies in New Zealand". Dominion Mus. Rec. Zool., Wellington 1: 59-69, 8+8 figures.
 Suter H. (1913). Manual of the New Zealand Mollusca. Wellington, 1120 pp. page 620.
 Suter H. (1915). Manual of the New Zealand Mollusca. Atlas of plates. John Mackay, Government printer, Wellington. plate 25, figure 2, 2a.

Charopidae